The Pioche Shale is an Early to Middle Cambrian Burgess shale-type Lagerstätte in Nevada.
It spans the Early–Middle Cambrian boundary; fossils from the Early Cambrian are preserved in botryoidal hematite, whereas those from the Middle Cambrian are preserved in the more familiar carbon films, and very reminiscent of the Chengjiang County preservation.

It preserves arthropods and worms familiar from the Burgess Shale.

It spans the early Cambrian Olenellus and basal Middle Cambrian Eokochaspis nodosa trilobite zones.

The eastern version of this shale can be found eastwards in Grand Canyon, as the Bright Angel Shale.

References

External links
Graphic of geology of area west-to-east for Lake Mead National Recreation Area (Nevada) & Grand Canyon (Arizona)

Cambrian Nevada
Lagerstätten
Shale formations of the United States
Cambrian System of North America